Entophlyctis is a genus of fungi currently classified in the family Chytriomycetaceae. The genus, widespread in temperate regions and contains about 20 species.

Species
E. apiculata
E. aurantiaca
E. aurea
E. brassicae
E. bulbigera
E. caudiformis
E. cienkowskiana
E. confervae-glomeratae
E. crenata
E. heliomorpha
E. lobata
E. luteolus
E. mammilliformis
E. maxima
E. molesta
E. obscura
E. reticulospora
E. salicorniae
E. sphaerioides
E. texana
E. willoughbyi
E. woronichinii

References

External links

Chytridiomycota genera